The Methodist Girls' High School founded as the Wesleyan Girls' High School is a secondary school for girls established by James Taylor, an uncle of Samuel Coleridge-Taylor under the auspices of the Wesleyan Society on 1 January 1880. The school is affiliated to the Methodist Boys' High School (Sierra Leone) established in Freetown by the May family under the auspices of the Methodist Society.

Sources
http://mghsogadc.com/historymghs.pdf
https://mghsoldgirlsuk.com/
http://mghsglobal.org/history.html

Schools in Freetown
Secondary schools in Sierra Leone
Educational institutions established in 1880
Methodism in Sierra Leone
Girls' schools in Sierra Leone
1880 establishments in Sierra Leone